Backaert is a surname. Notable people with the surname include:

Frederik Backaert (born 1990), Belgian cyclist
Jo Backaert (1921–1997), Belgian footballer